Shyamala is a 1952 Indian Tamil-language film directed by B. A. Subba Rao. The film stars M. K. Thyagaraja Bhagavathar and S. Varalakshmi. It was released on 29 November 1952.

Cast 
The cast adapted from the database of Film News Anandan and from the film credits.

Male
M. K. Thyagaraja Bhagavathar
Relangi
Stunt Somu
Nandaram
Vallinayagam
M. A. Ganapathi Bhat
K. Ramamoorthi
B. Seetharam
P. Suribabu

Female
S. Varalakshmi
T. Thilakam
T. Kanakam
S. Ashalatha
C. N. Padma
P. S. Lakshmi
Kantha S. Lal
A. Veenavathi
Baby Saraswathi

Production 
The film was simultaneously produced in Telugu with the title Tingu Ranga.

Soundtrack 
Music was composed by G. Ramanathan, T. V. Raju and S. B. Dinakar Rao while the lyrics were penned by Kambadasan and C. S. Natarajasundaram.

Reception 
The film did not fare well at the box office.

References

External links 

1950s Tamil-language films
Films directed by B. A. Subba Rao
Films scored by G. Ramanathan
Indian black-and-white films
Films scored by T. V. Raju
Films scored by S. B. Dinakar Rao